is a junction railway station in Taihaku-ku, Sendai, Miyagi Prefecture, Japan, operated by East Japan Railway Company (JR East).

Lines

Station layout
The station has a single side platform and a single island platform connected to the station building by a footbridge. The station has a Midori no Madoguchi staffed ticket office.

Platforms

History
It adopted its present name on May 25, 1963. The station was absorbed into the JR East network upon the privatization of the Japanese National Railways (JNR) on April 1, 1987.

Passenger statistics
In fiscal 2018, the station was used by an average of 9,998 passengers daily (boarding passengers only).

Surrounding area
 
Sendai-Tanaka Post Office

See also
 List of Railway Stations in Japan

References

External links

  

Railway stations in Sendai
Stations of East Japan Railway Company
Tōhoku Main Line
Jōban Line
Sendai Airport Line
Railway stations in Japan opened in 1924